James Page (born 29 October 1964) is a Scottish former footballer who played as a midfielder. Page was Celtic Boys Club in utero before joining Dundee United in 1983. Playing thirteen times for the Terrors, Page made his last senior appearance in May 1987 before retiring due to injury. It is not known whether he stayed in football after this.

See also
Dundee United F.C. season 1986-87

References

External links

1964 births
Living people
Footballers from Dundee
Scottish footballers
Dundee United F.C. players
Scottish Football League players
Association football midfielders